The 2009 Brown Bears football team was an American football team that represented Brown University during the 2009 NCAA Division I FCS football season. Brown finished third in the Ivy League. Brown averaged 6,033 fans per game.

In their 13th season under head coach Phil Estes, the Bears compiled a 6–4 record and outscored opponents 241 to 197. James Devlin and Paul Jasinowski were the team captains. 

The Bears' 4–3 conference record placed third in the Ivy League standings. They outscored Ivy opponents 159 to 125. 

Brown played its home games at Brown Stadium in Providence, Rhode Island.

Schedule

References

Brown
Brown Bears football seasons
Brown Bears football